OpenScientist is an integration of open source products working together to do scientific visualization and data analysis, in particular for high energy physics (HEP).

Among other things, it contains a light C++ AIDA implementation that can be used to run the histogramming part of Geant4 examples.

External links
 

Data analysis software
Experimental particle physics
Free plotting software
Physics software
Plotting software